Adah Rose Gallery is a fine arts gallery in Kensington, MD, a suburb of Washington, DC and part of the Greater Washington, DC capital area. The gallery was established in 2011 and represents local, regional and national artists. The gallery is located at 3766 Howard Ave, Kensington, MD 20895.

Artists represented 
The gallery represents several well-known national-level artists such as Jessica Drenk, Gregory Ferrand, Sheila Giolitti, Joan Belmar, and about a dozen others. In addition to monthly exhibitions in its Kensington space, the gallery also conducts "pop up" shows in various locations around the capital region area.

Critical Reception 
As one of the few art galleries in the Greater Washington area which regularly participates in national art fairs, the gallery's exhibitions have received significant critical coverage in the press, and the national art fairs have given its exhibition program a wide international audience. Its shows are regularly reviewed by the major Greater Washington, DC newsmedia.

References

External links
 Adah Rose Gallery website

Art museums and galleries in Washington, D.C.
Contemporary art galleries in the United States
Art galleries established in 2011
Art museums and galleries in Maryland
Women art dealers
American art dealers